Albert Hamilton Williams DeSouza is an Afro-Nicaraguan former professional baseball pitcher. He played all or part of five seasons in Major League Baseball, from  until , all for the Minnesota Twins.

Williams was originally signed by the Pittsburgh Pirates as an amateur free agent in 1975. He pitched two seasons in the Pirates minor league system, but was released by Pittsburgh 
because the Nicaraguan Government would not grant him a visa to leave the country to play baseball in the United States. This prompted Williams to sign up with the Sandinista rebels and he was engaged in jungle fighting against the forces of Anastasio Somoza from 1977 through 1978 during the Nicaraguan Revolution.

In 1979, Williams had to be smuggled out of Nicaragua and was signed a contract to play in the Inter-American League, where he pitched for the Caracas Metropolitanos and Panama Banqueros clubs. He then joined the Minnesota organization in 1980, where he spent five years. In 1984, he was the starting pitcher in the Twins season opener against the Detroit Tigers at the Metrodome.

In between, Williams played six seasons in the Venezuelan Winter League, making an appearance with the Tiburones de La Guaira in the 1983 Caribbean Series.

Baseball career

Minnesota Twins

1980 
On May 7, 1980, Albert Williams was called up to the Majors to make his debut against the Baltimore Orioles as a starter for 3 innings. In this game, he allowed 7 hits (making one of them a home run and having all four runs as earned) no walks, and struck out 2 batters.

On September 9, Williams started the game against the Milwaukee Brewers and finished it with having 6 hits off him: both runs as earned, 1 one strikeout, no homers allowed and allowing only 2 walks. Williams earned himself an ERA of 3.81 this game and won with the score of 15-2.

As a rookie in the Majors with the Twins, Williams pitched 18 games with a record of 6 wins and 2 lost and an ERA of 3.51. Out of the 18 games, 9 of them were as a starter and 3 of them were complete games. He pitched 77 innings, allowing 73 hits (9 of them being home runs). Williams struck out 35 batters and walked 30, having 33 runs scored on him.

Notes

Sources 
, or Retrosheet

1954 births
Living people
Alacranes de Campeche players
Caracas Metropolitanos players
Charleston Patriots players
Charleston Pirates players
Columbus Clippers players
Major League Baseball pitchers
Major League Baseball players from Nicaragua
Minnesota Twins players
Navegantes del Magallanes players
Nicaraguan expatriate baseball players in Venezuela
Nicaraguan expatriate baseball players in the United States
Nicaraguan revolutionaries
Panama Banqueros players
People from the South Caribbean Coast Autonomous Region
Tiburones de La Guaira players
Toledo Mud Hens players
Nicaraguan expatriate baseball players in Mexico